Agrigento (or  ; ;  or ; , or  Jirjant) is a city on the southern coast of Sicily, Italy and capital of the province of Agrigento. It was one of the leading cities of Magna Graecia during the golden age of Ancient Greece.

History

Akragas was founded on a plateau overlooking the sea, with two nearby rivers, the Hypsas and the Acragas, after which the settlement was originally named. A ridge, which offered a degree of natural fortification, links a hill to the north called Colle di Girgenti with another, called Rupe Atenea, to the east. According to Thucydides, it was founded around 582-580 BC by Greek colonists from Gela in eastern Sicily, with further colonists from Crete and Rhodes. The founders (oikistai) of the new city were Aristonous and Pystilus. It was the last of the major Greek colonies in Sicily to be founded.

Archaic period 

The territory under Akragas's control expanded to comprise the whole area between the Platani and the Salso, and reached deep into the Sicilian interior. Greek literary sources connect this expansion with military campaigns, but archaeological evidence indicates that this was a much longer term process which reached its peak only in the early fifth century BC. Most other Greek settlements in Sicily experienced similar territorial expansion in this period. Excavations at a range of sites in this region inhabited by the indigenous Sican people, such as Monte Sabbucina, Gibil-Gabil, Vasallaggi, San Angelo Muxano, and Mussomeli, show signs of the adoption of Greek culture. It is disputed how much of this expansion was carried out by violence and how much by commerce and acculturation. The territorial expansion provided land for the Greek settlers to farm, native slaves to work these farms, and control of the overland route from Acragas to the city of Himera on the northern coast of Sicily. This was the main land route from the Straits of Sicily to the Tyrrhenian Sea and Acragas' control of it was a key factor in its economic prosperity in the sixth and fifth centuries BC, which became proverbial. Famously, Plato, upon seeing the living standard of the inhabitants, was said to have remarked that "they build like they intend to live forever, yet eat like this is their last day." Perhaps as a result of this wealth, Acragas was one of the first communities in Sicily to begin minting its own coinage, around 520 BC.  

Around 570 BC, the city came under the control of Phalaris, a semi-legendary figure, who was remembered as the archetypal tyrant, said to have killed his enemies by burning them alive inside a bronze bull. In the ancient literary sources, he is linked with the military campaigns of territorial expansion, but this is probably anachronistic. He ruled until around 550 BC. The political history of Acragas in the second half of the sixth century is unknown, except for the names of two leaders, Alcamenes and Alcander. Acragas also expanded westwards over the course of the sixth century BC, leading to a rivalry with Selinus, the next Greek city to the west. The Selinuntines founded the city of Heraclea Minoa at the mouth of the Platani river, halfway between the two settlements, in the mid-sixth century BC, but the Acragantines conquered it around 500 BC.

Emmenid period   

Theron, a member of the Emmenid family, made himself tyrant of Acragas around 488 BC. He formed an alliance with Gelon, tyrant of Gela and Syracuse. Around 483 BC, Theron invaded and conquered Himera, Acragas’ neighbour to the north. The tyrant of Himera, Terillus joined his son-in-law, Anaxilas of Rhegium, and the Selinuntines in calling on the Carthaginians to come and restore Terillus to power. The Carthaginians did invade in 480 BC, the first of the Greco-Punic Wars, but they were defeated by the combined forces of Theron and Gelon at the Battle of Himera. As a result, Acragas was affirmed in its control of the central portion of Sicily, an area of around 3,500 km2. A number of enormous construction projects were carried out in the Valle dei Templi at this time, including the Temple of Olympian Zeus, which was one of the largest Greek temples ever built, and the construction of a massive Kolymbethra reservoir. According to Diodorus Siculus, they were built in commemoration of the Battle of Himera, using the prisoners captured in the war as slave labour. Archaeological evidence indicates that the boom in monumental construction actually began before the battle, but continued in the period after it. A major reconstruction of the city walls on a monumental scale also took place in this period. Theron sent teams to compete in the Olympic games and other Panhellenic competitions in mainland Greece. Several poems by Pindar and Simonides commemorated victories by Theron and other Acragantines, which provide insights into Acragantine identity and ideology at this time. Greek literary sources generally praise Theron as a good tyrant, but accuse his son Thrasydaeus, who succeeded him in 472 BC, of violence and oppression. Shortly after Theron's death, Hiero I of Syracuse (brother and successor of Gelon) invaded Acragas and overthrew Thrasydaeus. The literary sources say that Acragas then became a democracy, but in practice it seems to have been dominated by the civic aristocracy.

Classical and Hellenistic periods

The period after the fall of the Emmenids is not well-known. An oligarchic group called "the thousand" was in power for a few years in the mid-fifth century BC, but was overthrown - the literary tradition gives the philosopher Empedocles a decisive role in this revolution, but some modern scholars have doubted this. In 451 BC, Ducetius, leader of a Sicel state opposed to the expansion of Syracuse and other Greeks into the interior of Sicily invaded Acragantine territory, conquering an outpost called Motyum. Ducetius was defeated in 450, but the Syracusan decision to let Ducetius go outraged the Acragantines and they went to war with Syracuse. They were defeated in a battle on the Salso river, which left Syracuse the pre-eminent power in eastern Sicily. The defeat was serious enough that Acragas ceased to mint coinage for a number of years.  

Ancient sources considered Acragas to be a very large city at this time. Diodorus Siculus says that the population was 200,000 people, of which 20,000 were citizens. Diogenes Laertius put the population at an incredible 800,000. Some modern scholars have accepted Diodorus' numbers, but they seem to be far too high. Jos de Waele suggests a population of 16,000-18,000 citizens, while Franco de Angelis estimates a total population of around 30,000-40,000.

When Athens undertook the Sicilian Expedition against Syracuse from 415-413 BC, Acragas remained neutral. However, it was sacked by the Carthaginians in 406 BC. Acragas never fully recovered its former status, though it revived following the invasion of Timoleon in the late fourth century onwards and large-scale construction took place in the Hellenistic period. During the early 3rd century BC, a tyrant called Phintias declared himself king in Akragas, also controlling a variety of other cities. His kingdom was however not long-lived.

Roman period
The city was disputed between the Romans and the Carthaginians during the First Punic War. The Romans laid siege to the city in 262 BC and captured it after defeating a Carthaginian relief force in 261 BC and  sold the population into slavery. Although the Carthaginians recaptured the city in 255 BC the final peace settlement gave Punic Sicily and with it Akragas to Rome. It suffered badly during the Second Punic War (218–201 BC) when both Rome and Carthage fought to control it. The Romans eventually captured Akragas in 210 BC and renamed it Agrigentum, although it remained a largely Greek-speaking community for centuries thereafter. It became prosperous again under Roman rule and its inhabitants received full Roman citizenship following the death of Julius Caesar in 44 BC.

Middle Ages
After the fall of the Western Roman Empire, the city successively passed into the hands of the Vandalic Kingdom, the Ostrogothic Kingdom of Italy and then the Byzantine Empire. During this period the inhabitants of Agrigentum largely abandoned the lower parts of the city and moved to the former acropolis, at the top of the hill. The reasons for this move are unclear but were probably related to the destructive coastal raids of the Saracens and other peoples around this time.

Following the Norman conquest of Sicily, the city changed its name to the Norman version Girgenti. In 1087, Norman Count Roger I established a Latin bishopric in the city. Normans built the Castello di Agrigento to control the area. The population declined during much of the medieval period but revived somewhat after the 18th century.

Modern period
In 1860, as in the rest of Sicily, the inhabitants supported the arrival of Giuseppe Garibaldi during the Expedition of the Thousand (one of the most dramatic events of the Unification of Italy) which marked the end of Bourbon rule. In 1927, Benito Mussolini through the "Decree Law n. 159, July 12, 1927" introduced the current Italianized version of the Latin name. The decision remains controversial as a symbol of Fascism and the eradication of local history. Following the suggestion of Andrea Camilleri, a Sicilian writer of Agrigentine origin, the historic city centre was renamed to the Sicilian name "Girgenti" in 2016. The city suffered a number of destructive bombing raids during World War II.

Economy
Agrigento is a major tourist centre due to its extraordinarily rich archaeological legacy. It also serves as an agricultural centre for the surrounding region. Sulphur and potash were mined locally from Minoan times until the 1970s, and were exported worldwide from the nearby harbour of Porto Empedocle (named after the philosopher Empedocles, who lived in ancient Akragas). In 2010, the unemployment rate in Agrigento was 19.2%, almost twice the national average.

Main sights

Ancient Akragas covers a huge area—much of which is still unexcavated today—but is exemplified by the famous Valle dei Templi ("Valley of the Temples", a misnomer, as it is a ridge, rather than a valley). This comprises a large sacred area on the south side of the ancient city where seven monumental Greek temples in the Doric style were constructed during the 6th and 5th centuries BC. Now excavated and partially restored, they constitute some of the largest and best-preserved ancient Greek buildings outside of Greece itself. They are listed as a World Heritage Site.

The best-preserved of the temples are two very similar buildings traditionally attributed to the goddesses Hera Lacinia and Concordia (though archaeologists believe this attribution to be incorrect). The latter temple is remarkably intact, due to its having been converted into a Christian church in 597 AD. Both were constructed to a peripteral hexastyle design. The area around the Temple of Concordia was later re-used by early Christians as a catacomb, with tombs hewn out of the rocky cliffs and outcrops.

The other temples are much more fragmentary, having been toppled by earthquakes long ago and quarried for their stones. The largest by far is the Temple of Olympian Zeus, built to commemorate the Battle of Himera in 480 BC: it is believed to have been the largest Doric temple ever built. Although it was apparently used, it appears never to have been completed; construction was abandoned after the Carthaginian invasion of 406 BC. 
 
The remains of the temple were extensively quarried in the 18th century to build the jetties of Porto Empedocle. Temples dedicated to Hephaestus, Heracles and Asclepius were also constructed in the sacred area, which includes a sanctuary of Demeter and Persephone (formerly known as the Temple of Castor and Pollux); the marks of the fires set by the Carthaginians in 406 BC can still be seen on the sanctuary's stones.

Many other Hellenistic and Roman sites can be found in and around the town. These include a pre-Hellenic cave sanctuary near a Temple of Demeter, over which the Church of San Biagio was built. A late Hellenistic funerary monument erroneously labelled the "Tomb of Theron" is situated just outside the sacred area, and a 1st-century AD heroon (heroic shrine) adjoins the 13th century Church of San Nicola a short distance to the north. A sizeable area of the Greco-Roman city has also been excavated, and several classical necropoleis and quarries are still extant.

Much of present-day Agrigento is modern but it still retains a number of medieval and Baroque buildings. These include the 14th century cathedral and the 13th century Church of Santa Maria dei Greci ("St. Mary of the Greeks"), again standing on the site of an ancient Greek temple (hence the name). The town also has a notable archaeological museum displaying finds from the ancient city.

People
 Empedocles (5th Century BC), the Ancient Greek pre-Socratic philosopher, was a citizen of ancient Akragas.
 Tellias of Akragas, described in ancient sources as a hospitable man; when 500 horsemen were billeted with him during the winter, he gave each a tunic and cloak. 
 Karkinos of Akragas, a tragedian
 Tigellinus (born c10 AD), a Prefect of the Praetorian Guard and infamous associate of the Emperor Nero, belonged to a family of Greek descent in Agrigento - although he may have been born in Scyllaceum in Southern Italy, where his father is supposed to have lived in exile.
 Paolo Girgenti (1767–1815), a painter active in Naples who served as president of the Accademia di Belle Arti di Napoli, was born in Agrigento.
 Luigi Pirandello (1867-1936), dramatist and Nobel prize winner for literature, was born at contrada u Càvusu in Agrigento.
 Giovanni Leone (b. 1967), an Italian geophysicist and volcanologist, was born in Agrigento.
 Vinnie Paz (b. 1977), the Italian-American rapper and lyricist behind Philadelphia underground hip-hop group Jedi Mind Tricks.
 Larry Page (b. 1973), co-founder of Google, became an honorary citizen of Agrigento on August 4, 2017.

Twin towns – sister cities

Agrigento is twinned with:
 Perm, Russia
 Tampa, United States
 Valenciennes, France

See also
Siege of Akragas (406 BC)
Agrigentum inscription
Battle of Agrigentum (456)
List of mayors of Agrigento

References

Sources

External links

Yair Karelic's photos of the Valley of the Temples
Agrigento Old Town

 
Archaeological sites in Sicily
Municipalities of the Province of Agrigento
580s BC
Dorian colonies in Magna Graecia
Colonies of Gela
6th-century BC establishments in Italy
Populated places established in the 6th century BC